Mother Funders is an American reality documentary television series that premiered on June 14, 2015, on Bravo. The show follows the members of Parent Teacher Organization in the small town of Locust Grove, Georgia as they try to benefit their children's local elementary school by raising and donating money. Bravo aired a 30-minute preview special of the show on May 10, 2015.

Cast 

 Carla Stephens is the president of the organization; her son is about to graduate from the school, thus it is her last year as the head of the organization.
 Shayzon Prince is the vice president, has been on the board for several years.
 Robin Dyke is the volunteer coordinator, does not get along well with Carla; always eager to find new ways to bring more money to the school.
 Amber Bryant is the honorary volunteer, married to a former NFL player; familiar with Atlanta's social scene, always brings a lot of money due to her connections.
 LaShon Thompson is the secretary, has recently joined the organization; has her own company and always open for new business ventures.
 Amber Coulter is the volunteer, the newest member to the organization; encouraged to join by her husband in order to get away from her normal life.
 Shana Koorse is the ex-board member and current volunteer.

Episodes

International broadcast
In Australia, the preview special premiered on June 22, 2015 on Arena.

References

External links 

 
 
 

2010s American reality television series
2015 American television series debuts
2015 American television series endings
English-language television shows
Bravo (American TV network) original programming